Randy Brown (born May 22, 1968) is an American retired basketball player and former coach for the Chicago Bulls of the National Basketball Association (NBA). Brown was a guard who played at New Mexico State University and the University of Houston.

Professional career

Brown was selected by the Sacramento Kings in the second round of the 1991 NBA Draft. He played four seasons in Sacramento, scoring 1,349 points, but he would become best known for his tenure with the Chicago Bulls.

Brown signed with the Bulls in 1995, and he provided valuable energy and aggressiveness off the bench during the Bulls' second "three-peat" (1996–1998). A fan favorite, Brown was also one of the few veteran players who stayed with the Bulls after the 1998–99 lockout. With the absence of Michael Jordan, Scottie Pippen, and Dennis Rodman, he became a full-time starter and averaged 8.8 points, 3.8 assists, and 3.4 rebounds (all career highs) during the remainder of the 1998–99 season. After one more season in Chicago, Brown played briefly for the Boston Celtics and the Phoenix Suns, and he retired from the NBA in 2003 with 3,148 career points and 1,420 career assists.

Coaching career

In July 2009, Brown was hired by the Bulls as their director of player development. The next year, he was named special assistant to the general manager. In 2013, he was promoted to assistant general manager. In 2017, it was widely reported that rifts between players and the front office were in large part due to a mole reporting on player activities within the locker room to management. The identity of the mole has been speculated to be Randy Brown.

Career statistics 

Source

NBA

Regular season

|-
|style="text-align:left;|
|style="text-align:left;"|Sacramento
|56||0||9.6||.456||.000||.655||1.2||1.1||.6||.2||3.4
|-
|style="text-align:left;"|
|style="text-align:left;"|Sacramento
|75||34||23.0||.463||.333||.732||2.8||2.6||1.4||.5||7.6
|-
|style="text-align:left;"|
|style="text-align:left;"|Sacramento
|61||2||17.1||.438||.000||.609||1.8||2.2||1.0||.2||4.5
|-
|style="text-align:left;"|
|style="text-align:left;"|Sacramento
|67||2||16.2||.432||.298||.671||1.6||2.0||1.5||.3||4.7
|-
|style="text-align:left;background:#afe6ba;"|†
|style="text-align:left;"|Chicago
|68||0||9.9||.406||.091||.609||1.0||1.1||.8||.2||2.7
|-
|style="text-align:left;background:#afe6ba;"|†
|style="text-align:left;"|Chicago
|72||3||14.7||.420||.182||.679||1.5||1.8||1.1||.2||4.7
|-
|style="text-align:left;background:#afe6ba;"|†
|style="text-align:left;"|Chicago
|71||6||16.2||.384||.000||.718||1.3||2.1||1.0||.2||4.1
|-
|style="text-align:left;"|
|style="text-align:left;"|Chicago
|39||32||29.2||.414||.000||.757||3.4||3.8||1.7||.2||8.8
|-
|style="text-align:left;"|
|style="text-align:left;"|Chicago
|59||55||27.5||.361||.500||.738||2.4||3.4||1.0||.3||6.4
|-
|style="text-align:left;"|
|style="text-align:left;"|Boston
|54||35||22.9||.422||.000||.575||1.8||2.9||1.1||.2||4.1
|-
|style="text-align:left;"|
|style="text-align:left;"|Boston
|1||0||6.0||.000||–||–||.0||2.0||.0||1.0||.0
|-
|style="text-align:left;"|
|style="text-align:left;"|Phoenix
|32||0||8.2||.372||–||.750||.8||1.1||.5||.1||1.3
|- class="sortbottom"
|style="text-align:center;" colspan=2|Career
|655||169||17.6||.417||.200||.691||1.8||2.2||1.1||.2||4.8
|}

Playoffs

|-
|style="text-align:left;background:#afe6ba;"|1996†
|style="text-align:left;"|Chicago
|16||0||7.0||.571||.500||.750||.6||.4||.3||.1||2.8
|-
|style="text-align:left;background:#afe6ba;"|1997†
|style="text-align:left;"|Chicago
|17||0||5.8||.300||–||.600||.6||.4||.5||.1||1.2
|-
|style="text-align:left;background:#afe6ba;"|1998†
|style="text-align:left;"|Chicago
|14||0||5.1||.167||–||.833||.6||.6||.1||.0||.6
|- class="sortbottom"
|style="text-align:center;" colspan=2|Career
|47||0||6.0||.386||.500||.739||.6||.5||.3||.1||1.6
|}

Personal life
He is married with three children.

References

External links
NBA.com bio
Basketball-Reference.com bio

1968 births
Living people
African-American basketball players
American men's basketball players
Basketball players from Chicago
Boston Celtics players
Chicago Bulls assistant coaches
Chicago Bulls players
Houston Cougars men's basketball players
New Mexico State Aggies men's basketball players
Phoenix Suns players
Point guards
Sacramento Kings draft picks
Sacramento Kings players
21st-century African-American people
20th-century African-American sportspeople